The history of Dallas, Texas (USA) through 1838 documents the area's prehistory and the exploration that led to the area's settlement and Dallas' subsequent establishment.

New Spain

Caddo Native Americans inhabited the Dallas area before it was claimed, along with the rest of Texas, as a part of the Spanish Province of New Spain in the 16th century. The area was considerably proximate to French territory, but ambiguity was cleared in 1819 when the Adams-Onís Treaty made the Red River the northern boundary of New Spain.

Athanase de Mézières
Another European who probably visited the Dallas area was Athanase de Mézières in 1778.  De Mézières, a Frenchman then in the service of the King of Spain, probably crossed the West Fork of the Trinity River near present-day Fort Worth, having followed the western edge of the Eastern Cross Timbers from the Tawakoni Village on the Brazos River near present Waco. He then proceeded north to the Red River. He wrote:

De Mézières' biographer, Bolton, was convinced de Mézières was describing the Eastern Cross Timbers and the route would have him crossing the West Fork of the Trinity River between the present Fort Worth and Arlington.

Republic of Texas
Present-day Dallas remained under Spanish rule until 1821 when Mexico declared independence from Spain. The land that would become Dallas became part of the state of Coahuila y Tejas in the new nation. The Republic of Texas broke off from Mexico in 1836 and remained an independent country for nearly 10 years.

References

External links
 
 Dallas History from the Dallas Historical Society

1838